Cian Dayrit (born 1989) is a Filipino multimedia artist.

Early life and education 
Dayrit was born in 1989 in Metro Manila, Philippines. He graduated from the University of the Philippines Diliman's Fine Arts program in 2011.

Work 
Dayrit's interdisciplinary practice explores colonialism and ethnography, archaeology, history, and mythology. He has exhibited at venues such as the Metropolitan Museum of Manila.

Dayrit's first solo exhibition, The Bla-Bla Archaeological Complex, opened at the Jorge B. Vargas Museum in 2013. The show examined the role that varying strategies of display and representation, such as archaeological and architectural structures, play in understanding history. The show explored issues of identity, heritage, and nationhood.

Dayrit's second and third solo exhibitions, Polycephalous and Spectacles of the Third World, continue his inquiry into, "origins and histories, and their representations in visual apparatuses, from the map, curiosity cabinet, and on to the museum."

In late 2017, Artnet announced that Dayrit would be featured in the 4th New Museum Triennial titled Songs for Sabotage at the New Museum in New York in 2018. The Triennial, co-curatored by Gary Carrion-Murayari and Alex Gartenfeld, explored, "interventions into cities, infrastructures, and the networks of everyday life, bringing together objects that could potentially create shared, or common, experiences."

Dayrit was featured in the 11th Berlin Biennale in Berlin in 2020.

Exhibitions

Solo exhibitions 
 The Bla-Bla Archaeological Complex, U.P. Vargas Museum, Quezon City, Philippines, 2013
 Polycephalous, Art Informal, San Juan City, Philippines, 2014
Spectacles of the Third World, Tin-Aw Gallery, Makati, Philippines, 2015
Busis Ibat Ha Kanayunan (Voices from the Hinterlands), Bellas Artes Projects, Makati, Philippines, 2018
 Beyond the God's Eye, Nome Gallery, Berlin, Germany, 2019

Group exhibitions 
 Omega, Tam-Awan Village Gallery, Baguio City, Philippines, 2013
 Applied Savagery, Now Gallery, Makati, Philippines, 2013
 The President’s Office, U.P. Vargas Museum, Quezon City, Philippines, 2013
 Paperviews 14: On Immanence, Project Space Pilipinas, Lucban, Quezon Province, Philippines, 2014
 Exposition, Lopez Memorial Museum, 2016
 Almost There, Jorge B. Vargas Museum, Quezon City, Philippines, 2017
 Shelf Life of Being, MONO8, Manila, Philippines, 2021

Awards 
 Finalist, Ateneo Art Awards - Fernando Zóbel Prizes for Visual Art (2014)
 Winner, Ateneo Art Awards - Fernando Zóbel Prizes for Visual Art (2017)
 Recipient, Cultural Center of the Philippines Thirteen Artists Awards (2018)

References 

21st-century Filipino artists
Textile artists
Collage artists
Filipino sculptors
Living people
1989 births